The Ligurian regional election of 2015 took place on 31 May 2015.

Giovanni Toti of Forza Italia, who benefited of the decisive support of the Northern League Liguria, was elected President in a three-way race with Raffaella Paita of the Democratic Party, which was the largest party, and Alice Salvatore of the Five Star Movement.

Electoral system
The Regional Council of Liguria is composed of 30 members, plus the president elect. The president elect is the candidate winning a plurality of votes at the election. Within the council, 24 seats are elected in provincial constituencies by proportional representation. The remaining 6 councillors are assigned as a majority bonus if the winning candidate has less than 18 seats, otherwise they are distributed among the losing coalitions.

A single list must get at least 3% of the votes in a province in order to access the proportional distribution of seats, unless the list is connected to a coalition with more than 5% of the vote.

Parties and candidates

Results

See also
2015 Italian regional elections

References

Elections in Liguria
2015 elections in Italy
May 2015 events in Italy